Annika Johansson   (born 4 March 1967) is a Swedish freestyle skier. 

She won a bronze medal in ski ballet at the FIS Freestyle World Ski Championships 1995. She also won bronze medals in ski ballet in the 1997 and 1999 world championships.

She took part in the 1992 Winter Olympics in Albertville, where si ballet was a demonstration event.

References

External links 
 

1967 births
Living people
Swedish female freestyle skiers
20th-century Swedish women